Mikałaj Karłavič Ramanoŭski (Belarusian:Мікалай Карлавіч Раманоўскі), also known by the pseudonym Kuźma Čorny (Belarusian:Кузьма Чорны, 24 June 1900 in Borki, Białystok County, north-eastern Poland – 22 November 1944 in Minsk, Belarus) was a Belarusian poet, writer, dramatist, and opinion journalist. He studied at the pedagogue school in Niaśviž from 1916 until 1919. During the 1920s, he worked as a teacher in Słuck. In 1923, he was working in the faculty of literature and linguistics (pedagogue department) in the Belarusian State University in Minsk. From 1924 to 1928, he worked as a journalist in a magazine Biełaruskaja vioska. In 1923, he was a member of a literary organisation Maładniak, and editor of Uzvyšša for five years from 1926 until 1931. During the Second World War, he lived in Moscow, working in a journal Razdavim fashistkuyu gadinu and Biełaruś. Then he moved back to Minsk. He died on 22 November 1944, aged 44. He was an author of children's literature.

References 
 Kuzma
 "Čorny Kuźma", Great Soviet Encyclopedia. Retrieved 2017-02-16

Further reading 
 Janka Kazeka, Kusma Tschorny: Старонкі творчасці. Janka Kazeka, Minsk: Мастацкая літаратура. 1980, S. 133.
 Их именами названы...: Энциклопедический справочник / Редкол.: И. П. Шамякин (гл. ред.) и др. БелСЭ, Minsk 1987, S. 671–672.
 История белорусской советской литературы. И.Я. Науменко, П.К. Дюбайло, Н.С. Перкин, Академия наук БССР, Минск, 1977, S. 429–446.

1900 births
1944 deaths
Writers from Minsk
Belarusian male poets
Belarusian male writers
Belarusian dramatists and playwrights
20th-century Belarusian poets
20th-century male writers